Thomas Lote may refer to:

 Thomas Lote (MP fl. 1363)
 Thomas Lote (MP fl. 1380–1390)
 Thomas Lote (inventor), see Fire engine